Georgy Mikhailovich Lisitsin or Lisitsyn (11 October 1909 – 20 March 1972) was a Russian chess master from Leningrad. After high school he entered the Leningrad Industrial Institute, from which he graduated as a mechanical engineer.

Chess career 
He earned the title of Master in 1931 for his performance in the 7th USSR Championship. He thrice won the Leningrad City Chess Championship, in 1933/34 (joint), 1939, and 1947 (joint). He was a frequent participant in the USSR Chess Championship. His best result was in 1933 when he shared 3rd, behind the winner Mikhail Botvinnik. He also played in international tournaments, finishing 15th in Moscow 1935. (Botvinnik and Salo Flohr won.) He took 2nd at Helsinki 1946 behind winner Viacheslav Ragozin.

Lisitsin was considered an expert on the Reti Opening above all others and won many of his best games with it. He was an author of several chess books,  only a few sections of which have been translated from Russian into English. He wrote primarily about strategy, tactics, and endgame theory.

He was awarded the International Master title in 1950.

References

Books in English 
 

 

  Note: Merges the First Book of Chess Strategy and Second Book of Chess Strategy into a single volume.

External links 

1909 births
1972 deaths
Russian chess players
Chess International Masters
20th-century chess players